French ship Revanche may refer to:
 French frigate Revanche (1795)
 French ironclad Revanche

French Navy ship names